Adambakkam is a station under construction on the Chennai MRTS. The station exclusively serves the Chennai MRTS and serves the neighbourhood of Adambakkam.

History
As of 2022, Adambakkam station was still under construction and is expected to be opened soon, as part of the second-phase extension of the Chennai MRTS network.

Service and connections
Adambakkam station will be the 20th station on the MRTS line to St. Thomas Mount. In the return direction from St. Thomas Mount, it will be the second station towards Chennai Beach station.

Station access through road
This MRTS station is being constructed at the western end of the southern arm of the Inner Ring Road (IRR).
Major road access to this station are from
 Grand Southern Trunk Road (GST/NH45) – from the intersection near Officers Training Academy and Nanganallur Road metro station
 Inner Ring Road
 Mount–Medavakkam road

See also

 Chennai MRTS
 Chennai suburban railway
 Chennai Metro
 Transport in Chennai

References

Further reading
 "HC declines to shift MRTS station", The Times of India, Chennai, 22 Aug 2010

Chennai Mass Rapid Transit System stations
Railway stations in Chennai